Vinyldiphenylphosphine is the organophosphorus compound with the formula (C6H5)2PCH=CH2.  This colorless, air-sensitive solid is used as a precursor to ligands used in coordination chemistry and homogeneous catalysis. It is prepared by treating chlorodiphenylphosphine with vinyl Grignard reagents.

References

Tertiary phosphines
Phenyl compounds
Vinyl compounds